The Secretary of Public Safety of Puerto Rico leads the Department of Public Safety, with its agencies, in all matters of law enforcement and emergency response. The position and department was formed in April 2017, when Governor Ricardo Rosselló signed into law the unification of the emergency service agencies in Puerto Rico. The secretary overlooks the actions of the agencies but does not have direct control over them.

List of secretaries
2017 - May 2019: Héctor Pesquera
May 2019 - December 2019: Elmer Román
December 2019 - January 2021: Pedro Janer
January 2021 – present: Alexis Torres

References

External links
 Official website 

Council of Secretaries of Puerto Rico